Awadh Kishore Saran (1922 –  2003), popularly known as A. K. Saran, was an Indian scholar, editor, and writer who was one of the most influential voices on traditionalist thoughts in the Hindu world.

Career
Saran's works frequently featured traditionalists and perennialist philosophers such as Frithjof Schuon and, in particular, Ananda K. Coomaraswamy, whom Saran first encountered when he was ten years old. He served as a professor of sociology at the University of Lucknow in Lucknow, India and held the Gamaliel chair in peace and justice at the Cardinal Stritch University in Milwaukee, Wisconsin.

Works
 Traditional thought: Toward an axiomatic approach : a book on reminders (Samyag-vak special series) (1996)
 Illuminations: A School for the Regeneration of Man's Experience, Imagination, and Intellectual Integrity : a Proposal (in Two Parts) (1996)
 On the Intellectual Vocation: A Rosary of Edifying Texts with an Analytical-elucidatory Essay (1996)
 Sociology of knowledge and traditional thought (Samyag-vāk special series) (1998)
 Traditional Vision of Man (1998)
 Takamori Lecture: The Crisis of Mankind : an Inquiry Into Originally/novelty, Power/violence (1999)
 The Marxian theory of social change : a logico-philosophical critique (2000)
 Meaning and Truth; Lectures on the Theory of Language : A Prolegomena to the General Theory of Society and Culture (2003)
 Environmental Psychology (2005)
 On the Theories of Secularism and Modernization (Samyak-Vak Special Series, 9) (2007)

References

See also
 Seyyed Hossein Nasr
 Reza Shah-Kazemi
 Leo Schaya
 Philip Sherrard
 Wolfgang Smith
 William Stoddart
 Michel Valsan
 Elémire Zolla

1922 births
2003 deaths
20th-century Indian scholars
21st-century Indian scholars
Indian sociologists
20th-century Indian male writers
21st-century Indian male writers
Academic staff of the University of Lucknow
Indian expatriates in the United States
Traditionalist School